The Wardha River, also known as the Varada River, is a major river in Vidarbha, Maharashtra, which originates in the Satpura Range and flows into the Wain ganga river to form the Pranhita river which finally joins the Godavari river.

Origin 

Course 
After travelling for another , it joins the Wainganga, forming the Pranahita, which ultimately flows into the Godavari River.

Tributaries 
The Kar, Wena, Jam, and Erai are its left-bank tributaries, while the Madu, Bembala, and Penganga are its right-bank tributaries. The Bembla, is also an important tributary of River Wardha.

Dams 
The Upper Wardha Dam is located on the Wardha river near Morshi. It is considered a lifeline for the city of Amravati and the Morshi and Warud Talukas. The Lower Wardha Dam is located near Warud Bagaji and Dhanodi in Amravati District. It caters to Wardha District. A dam on the Bembala River has been constructed near Babhulgaon in Yavatmal district, and is considered a lifeline for part of Yavatmal.

Notes

Rivers of Maharashtra
Rivers of Madhya Pradesh
Rivers of Nagpur District
Tributaries of the Godavari River
Rivers of India